Terry Riordan (born July 27, 1973) is a former professional lacrosse player. He was a member of Major League Lacrosse's Los Angeles Riptide and plays attack. He also played for the Long Island Lizards in 2001 and 2002. Terry's brother James played lacrosse at Penn and another brother, Dan, had a brief career in the NLL. In 2008, Riordan scored 13 goals with 2 assists in helping the Riptide to a 7 and 5 record.

College career
Riordan played high school lacrosse in Baldwin, Long Island where he was All-County. He attended Johns Hopkins University where he led the Blue Jays to three NCAA Men's Lacrosse Championship semifinal and one quarterfinal appearance. He was a four-time All-American and twice named to the first team. He is fourth all-time in goals scored in NCAA history and is currently the all-time goal scorer and all-time Blue Jays points leader as well. Riordan won the Jack Turnbull Award and Lt. Raymond Enners Award in 1995.

Acting career
In addition to his career in professional lacrosse, Terry pursued professional acting attending the Lee Strasberg institute. He appeared in the television series Rescue Me, As the World Turns and The Guiding Light. Riordan was also in the 2007 Broadway revival, The Ritz.

Statistics

Johns Hopkins University

[a] 11th in NCAA Division I career goals
[b] 1st in career point at Johns Hopkins

__

MLL

See also
Johns Hopkins Blue Jays lacrosse
NCAA Men's Division I Lacrosse Records

References

External links
1993 NCAA Quarterfinals
CSTV: Center Stage with Terry Riordan

Terry Riordan - 04.24.95 - SI Vault

Awards

1973 births
Living people
Major League Lacrosse players
Johns Hopkins Blue Jays men's lacrosse players